Jaan Tooming (born 28 March 1946 in Tallinn) is an Estonian actor, theatre and film director and writer.

In 1968 he graduated from the Tallinn State Conservatory (now, the Estonian Academy of Music and Theatre). From 1969 to 2009 he was an actor and stage director in Vanemuine theatre in Tartu.

Filmography
 Kolme katku vahel (1970)
 Lõppematu päev (1971)
 Vasksed käepidemed (1971)
 Värvilised unenäod (1974)
 Karikakramäng: Salakütt (1977)
 Põrgupõhja uus Vanapagan (1977)
 Taevapõdra rahvaste laulud (1978)
 Mees ja mänd (1979)
 Carl Orffi ooper Kuu (1989) 
 November (2017)

References

1946 births
Living people
Estonian male stage actors
Estonian male film actors
Estonian theatre directors
Estonian film directors
20th-century Estonian male actors
21st-century Estonian male actors
Estonian male poets
Estonian male short story writers
Estonian dramatists and playwrights
20th-century Estonian writers
21st-century Estonian writers
Estonian Academy of Music and Theatre alumni
Recipients of the Order of the White Star, 4th Class
Male actors from Tallinn
Writers from Tallinn